The Union is a daily newspaper serving Grass Valley and Nevada County, California. The Union provides news coverage of the local and regional level. Sections include news, sports, opinion, entertainment, and more. It has a daily print circulation of over 14,000 copies. As a local newspaper, most readers live in Nevada County area. The Union also publishes an online edition. Sixty-five people work for the newspaper.

History
The Union began publication as the Grass Valley Daily Morning Union on October 28, 1864. Jim Townsend and Henry Meyer Blumenthal founded the paper to support the Union cause and the re-election of Abraham Lincoln during the Civil War. Although the paper was founded for the purpose of supporting Lincoln's candidacy, Townsend immediately tried to sell the venture to a rival newspaper that supported the candidacy of George B. McClellan, Lincoln's Democratic Party rival. Blumenthal ousted Townsend and continued supporting Lincoln. The day before the election, a group of men led by John Rollin Ridge went to the offices of the newspaper and assaulted Blumenthal. One report states that Ridge committed the assault. In the 21st century, the newspaper identifies Blumenthal as the founder of the newspaper.

Every issue in later years has carried the motto "Founded in 1864 to Preserve The Union - One and Inseparable."  In 1893 the Union became the Associated Press wire service's first affiliate in the West. The Union incorporated in 1906. From 1864 to March 1945, it was a morning paper. It ran as an afternoon paper until July 1999 when it resumed morning delivery. Over the Union's history, twelve men and one woman have served as publisher.

In 1906, The Union moved down the street from its original location to "The Union", a building at 151 Mill Street, Grass Valley. Both historic buildings still stand in downtown Grass Valley. In 1978, the paper moved from downtown to its current location at 464 Sutton Way, Grass Valley.

Thomas Ingram started working for the paper in the 1890s as an apprentice in the printing department and worked his way up to managing editor. The Ingram family purchased the newspaper in 1946. Swift Communications acquired the paper in 1968. Late in 2021, Ogden Newspapers acquired Swift Communications. In June, 2022, Ogden sold the newspaper to Gold Hill California Media.

References

External links
 Official website

Daily newspapers published in California
Grass Valley, California
Nevada County, California
Publications established in 1864